F. M. B. "Marsh" Cook was a political candidate in Mississippi who was murdered by white supremacists for campaigning for a seat at Mississippi's 1890 Constitutional Convention. A Republican, he was campaigning Jasper County, Mississippi. He was ambushed by six men and shot 27 times. A historical marker commemorates his death. He was white.

Mississippi's 1890 Constitutional Convention was organized to disenfranchise African American voters. Cook was an 1888 candidate for a seat in the U.S. Congress. Democrats had retaken control of Mississippi after the Reconstruction era. He was assassinated as he approached a log schoolhouse in a rural area. His body was found hours later by a woman. His murder received national news coverage. No one was ever prosecuted for it.

Previous election campaign
He contested his election loss to Chapman L. Anderson. Anderson recorded about five times as many votes as Cook in the November 1889 election.

References

Deaths by firearm in Mississippi
1890 murders in the United States